Speiredonia inocellata is a species of moth of the family Erebidae first described by Shigero Sugi in 1996. It is found on Japan's Ogasawara Islands.

External links
 

Moths of Japan
Moths described in 1996
Speiredonia